The 2022 North East Lincolnshire Council election took place on 5 May 2022 to elect members of North East Lincolnshire Council in England. This was on the same day as other local elections.

Results summary

Ward results

Croft Baker

East Marsh

Freshney

Haverstoe

Heneage

Humberston and New Waltham

Immingham

Park

Scartho

South

Sidney Sussex

Waltham

West March

Wolds

Yarborough

References

2022 English local elections
2022
2020s in Lincolnshire